David J. Campanale (born October 7, 1952) is a retired Chief Master Sergeant  of the United States Air Force who served as the 11th Chief Master Sergeant of the Air Force from 1994 to 1996.

Early life
Campanale was born in Worcester, Massachusetts, on October 7, 1952. He graduated from North High School and entered the United States Air Force in October 1970
.

Military career
Campanale completed technical training as an aircraft maintenance specialist at Sheppard Air Force Base, Texas. In February 1971, he was assigned as a B-52 Stratofortress crew chief in the 2nd Organization Maintenance Squadron, Barksdale Air Force Base, Louisiana. While there, he completed three successive tours at Andersen Air Force Base, Guam, in support of B-52 Operation Arc Light missions in Southeast Asia. His career included tours at bases in Indiana, Hawaii, New Hampshire, and Nebraska. He served as Senior Enlisted Advisor to the 93rd Bomb Wing, Castle Air Force Base, California; and Air Mobility Command, Scott Air Force Base, Illinois.

Campanale served as the Chief Master Sergeant of the Air Force from October 1994 to November 1996. His most notable contributions include a push for single dorm occupancy, which led to the current dorm single occupancy policy, and a reduction of DUI incidents at Castle Air Force Base in one year from over 190, to fewer than five. Campanale also fought a uniform change which removed name tapes and rank insignia from the battle dress uniform. The Air Force swapped for a short time to a single black label worn over the left breast pocket which contained text including the rank, name, and position of the individual. Disagreeing with this change, Campanale said,

Within a few weeks, the black patch was being phased out, and the rank insignia/name tapes were on the way back in.

Campanale was accused of being a personal friend of a Bataan prisoner of war impostor, whom he was promoting for an NCO of the Year-type award. Despite being advised of serious discrepancies in the impostor's story and credentials, Campanale dismissed all allegations. After Campanale was replaced by  Eric W. Benken the matter was re-assessed.

Campanale retired from active duty effective January 1, 1997.  He now resides in southern Arizona and frequently speaks at Air Force gatherings.

Assignments
October 1970 – December 1970, Basic Military Training, Lackland Air Force Base, Texas
December 1970 – February 1971, student, technical training, Sheppard Air Force Base, Texas
February 1971 – April 1974, B-52 Stratofortress crew chief, 2nd Organizational Maintenance Squadron, Barksdale Air Force Base, Louisiana.
April 1974 – August 1978, 305th Field Maintenance Squadron, Grissom Air Force Base, Indiana.
August 1978 – August 1983, C-130 Hercules crew chief; noncommissioned officer in charge, C-130 inspection branch; and maintenance superintendent, 6594th Test Group, Air Force Systems Command, Hickam Air Force Base, Hawaii
August 1983 – August 1986, FB-111A and KC-135 Stratotanker flight chief and line chief, 509th Organizational Maintenance Squadron; and senior maintenance controller for the deputy commander for maintenance, 509th Bomb Wing, Pease Air Force Base, New Hampshire.
August 1986 – May 1989, FB-111A and B-1B Lancer systems program manager, Headquarters Strategic Air Command, – Offutt Air Force Base, Nebraska.
May 1989 – February 1992, senior enlisted adviser, 93rd Bomb Wing, Castle Air Force Base, Calif.
February 1992 – October 1994, senior enlisted adviser, Military Airlift Command and Air Mobility Command, Scott Air Force Base, Illinois.
October 1994 – November 1996, Chief Master Sergeant of the Air Force, The Pentagon, Washington, D.C.

Awards and decorations

Other achievements

References

1952 births
Living people
Chief Master Sergeants of the United States Air Force
Recipients of the Air Force Distinguished Service Medal
Recipients of the Legion of Merit